Duthie Books was a chain of bookstores operating in Vancouver from 1957-2010. It was founded by Bill Duthie, "a storied bookseller who championed authors and wheeled-and-dealed with publishers, becoming a fixture on the Canadian literary scene." The stores were run by his three children – Cathy, Celia, and David – following his death in 1984. 

The first store opened on Robson Street near the public library. The shop had expanded to locations on W. 10th Avenue, Seymour Street, Hastings Street, and the Arbutus Village by the time of Duthie's death. A series of expansions through the 1990s led to a peak of ten shops throughout the city, but also left the bookseller in poor financial condition. The company declared bankruptcy in 1999. A single store remained open at 2239 West 4th Avenue, which closed in January 2010, causing widespread commentary about the death of this landmark Vancouver book store.

References

Independent bookstores of Canada
Retail companies established in 1957
Retail companies disestablished in 2010
Shops in Vancouver